Sweet Kissin' in the Moonlight: Den första kyssen is a studio album by Thorleifs, released 29 April 2009. Even a Danish language-version of the album, Sweet Kissin' in the Moonlight: Det første kys, was recorded.

Track listing
"Ett litet ristat hjärta"
"Upp till dans"
"Där du är"
"Glöm ej bort att älska varann"
"Sweet Kissin' in the Moonlight"
"Orden hon sa" ("Open Your Heart")
"Kan du pröva att förstå"
"Kom stanna hos mig"
"Rör vid min själ" ("You Raise Me Up")
"Party Town" ("Party Time")
"En ängel längs min väg"
"Tusen vita syrener"
"Varm korv boogie"

Contributors
Thorleifs – musicians

Charts

Weekly charts

Year-end charts

Certifications

References

2009 albums
Thorleifs albums